The Avtoros Shaman is a four cylinder diesel engine 8x8 all-terrain vehicle, built by Russian company Avtoros. The vehicle's design includes the ability to carry eight passengers, the use of low pressure tyres, an optional extra that can allow it to navigate on water, a "captain's chair" driving position, and three drive modes - both on and off-road capabilities, and a "crab" mode that allows the car to move sideways. Its design was intended to allow it to navigate all forms of terrain and be an ideal choice for outdoor adventures, with each vehicle costing over €250.000. As the vehicle takes two months to be manufactured, buyers have the option to customize their purchase during this stage.

Specifications

Operators
: 4 Shamans were delivered to the Defence Force of Haiti in March 2018.

See also
 TREKOL another Russian manufacture of large ATVs

References

Links

 Official website

Eight-wheel drive
Off-road vehicles